Fredrick Percival Segbefia is a Ghanaian politician and member of the first parliament of the second republic of Ghana representing Avenor constituency in the Volta Region of Ghana under the membership of the National Alliance Liberals (NAL).

Early life and education 
Fredrick was born on 8 September 1931. He attended Odorgonno Senior High School, Huddersfield Technical College and Leeds University. where he obtained a Bachelor of Laws.

Career and politics 
Segbefia worked as a barrister, solicitor and businessman before going into Parliament.

He was sworn into the First Parliament of the Second Republic of Ghana on 1 October 1969, after being pronounced winner at the 1969 Ghanaian election held on 26 August 1969. and his tenure of office ended on 13 January 1972.

Personal life 
He is Christian.

References 

1931 births
Living people
National Alliance of Liberals politicians
Ghanaian MPs 1969–1972
Ghanaian Christians
People from Volta Region